Ayukhanovo (Ayıwxan) is a rural locality (a village) in Rayevsky Selsoviet, Davlekanovsky District, Bashkortostan, Russia. The population was 286 as of 2010. There are 3 streets.

Geography 
Ayukhanovo is located 16 km southeast of Davlekanovo (the district's administrative centre) by road. Rayevo is the nearest rural locality.

References 

Rural localities in Davlekanovsky District